Edward Archibald "Red" Briden (July 16, 1897 – June 8, 1974) was a Canadian retired professional ice hockey player who played 14 games in the National Hockey Association, 72 games in the National Hockey League, 82 games in the Pacific Coast Hockey Association, and 55 games in the Western Canada Hockey League between 1916 and 1932. He played with the Toronto Blueshirts, Seattle Metropolitans, Victoria Cougars, Edmonton Eskimos, Calgary Tigers, Pittsburgh Pirates, Boston Bruins, and Detroit Cougars.

He was raised in Renfrew, Ontario.

Career statistics

Regular season and playoffs

External links

1897 births
1974 deaths
Calgary Tigers players
Cleveland Indians (IHL) players
Boston Bruins players
Canadian ice hockey left wingers
Detroit Red Wings players
Edmonton Eskimos (ice hockey) players
Ice hockey people from Ontario
London Panthers players
London Tecumsehs players
People from Renfrew County
Philadelphia Arrows players
Pittsburgh Pirates (NHL) players
Seattle Metropolitans players
Toronto Blueshirts players
Victoria Cougars (1911–1926) players
Canadian expatriate ice hockey players in the United States